The Town of Northam was a local government area of Western Australia for the town of Northam in the Wheatbelt region of Western Australia,  north-east of the capital, Perth along Great Eastern Highway. The Town had a population of 6,009 as of the 2006 census.

In January 2007, the Department of Local Government and Regional Development recommended the council merge with the surrounding Shire of Northam to become a single entity. Following the failure of a referendum on 28 April 2007 within the Shire of Northam to stop the move, the amalgamation proceeded on 1 July 2007.

History
On 4 November 1879, the Municipality of Northam was constituted to govern the affairs of the town of Northam.

On 1 July 1961, the Municipality became a Town under the Local Government Act 1860.

Amalgamation
In September 2006, the Town received a report into the possibility of merging with the Shire of Northam, and on 31 October 2006, the Local Government Advisory Board received a proposal to that effect from both councils. Public meetings in December 2006 announced that the new council would be known as the Shire of Northam, and would come into existence on 1 July 2007, initially operated by a board of commissioners (two from each entity plus an independent chair).

In January 2007, the Local Government Advisory Board officially recommended to the Minister for Local Government that the amalgamation proceed.

Wards
The town had 9 councillors plus an elected mayor, and no wards.

Population

References

Northam
1879 establishments in Australia
Northam, Western Australia
2007 disestablishments in Australia